Sharesome is an adult social media website founded in 2018 and based in Cyprus. The website's founders claim they built Sharesome for adult content creators and to offer them tools to grow their audience. Due to its familiar social network design, the platform has been dubbed “the Facebook of porn".

Site overview 
Email is not required for registration and users can stay anonymous. The platform allows users to join or create topics and interact with each other based on shared interests. Inside topics, users can upload content as well as share links of photos, videos and GIFs. Communities are manually moderated according to their guidelines. Sharesome receives 2.5 million visits per month and is ranked #8,500 in the United States according to SimilarWeb. The platform gained most of its user base because of the Tumblr ban on NSFW content. Unlike other adult content providers, who traditionally rely on older or less tech-savvy audiences for monetization.

History 
Sharesome was launched in 2018. The company has reported over one million user registrations to its Flame Token airdrop.

References

External links 
 

Adult dating websites
Cypriot erotica and pornography websites
Internet properties established in 2018